USS Peterson may refer to the following ships of the United States Navy:

 , a destroyer escort that saw action during World War II and was struck in 1973
 , a  that served from 1977 to 2002

See also

United States Navy ship names